Sarah Taylor may refer to:

 Sarah Knox Taylor (1814–1835), daughter of US President Zachary Taylor and wife of Confederacy President Jefferson Davis
 Sarah McFarland Taylor, academic and author
 Sarah Taylor (personality), Canadian television personality
 Sarah Taylor (soldier) (1841–1886), American Civil War soldier
 Sarah Taylor (cricketer) (born 1989), English cricketer
 Sarah Taylor (field hockey) (born 1981), Australian field hockey player
 Sarah Taylor (squash player) (born 1974), Jersey squash player
 Sarah Taylor (tennis) (born 1981), American tennis player
 Sarah Mary Taylor (1916–2000), African American quiltmaker from Mississippi

See also
Sara Taylor (born 1974), American issue strategist specialising in integrating data and technology
Taylor (disambiguation)
List of people with surname Taylor